Sham Kwok Fai (born 30 May 1984 in Hong Kong) is a former Hong Kong professional footballer and current coach at Hong Kong Premier League club Southern. He also plays as an amateur player for Hong Kong First Division club Citizen.

He is the elder brother of footballer Sham Kwok Keung.

Honours
 Happy Valley
Hong Kong First Division: 2002–03, 2005–06
Hong Kong Senior Shield: 2003–04
Hong Kong FA Cup: 2003–04

 Citizen
Hong Kong FA Cup: 2007–08
Hong Kong Senior Shield: 2010–11

Career statistics

International career
As of 2 October 2011

Personal life
Sham Kwok Fai successfully proposed marriage to his girlfriend of six years, Stephanie on 31 December 2011. His Citizen teammates sang "唯獨你是不可取替" (You alone are irreplaceable), an Andy Hui hit song, as he proposed. But he said the wedding will probably have to wait until 2013, as he needs to save money for it and their house.

References

External links

Profile at HKFA

1984 births
Living people
Hong Kong footballers
Association football defenders
Happy Valley AA players
Citizen AA players
Hong Kong Premier League players
Hong Kong international footballers
Footballers at the 2006 Asian Games
TSW Pegasus FC players
Southern District FC players
Asian Games competitors for Hong Kong
Hong Kong League XI representative players